The city of Argos dedicated several ex votos within the sanctuary of Apollo in Delphi. It was, after all, one of the most powerful cities of the archaic and classical period.

Description 
Next to a portico apparently built by the Arcadians along the Sacred Way in the sanctuary of Apollo in Delphi the visitor would see a semicircular pedestal, dedicated by the Argives after 369 B.C., in order to stress their contribution in the building of the city of Messene, capital of the liberated Messenians. The so-called pedestal of the Argive kings depicted the mythical founder of the dynasty, Danaos, and some of his descendants. Cyriacus of Ancona, visiting the antiquities of Delphi in 1436, mistook the semicircular base of this ex voto of the Argives for the remains of the temple of Apollo. 
Three ex votos by the Argives and one by the Athenians stood next to the ex voto of the Lacaedemonians further up the Sacred Way. The first one depicted the Seven heroes who campaigned against Thebes led by the fallen king Polyneikes. The rest of the heroes were Adrastus, Amphiaraus, Kapaneus, Tydeus, Eteoclus, Alitherses and Hippomedon. Nothing is unfortunately preserved from that ex voto.  Pausanias mentions that a simulation of the Trojan Horse was also dedicated by the Argives, of which only the rectangular base is preserved; finally an impressive semi-circular pedestal where the statues of the descendants of the Seven Heroes stood.

References

Delphi
Ancient Argos